Joel Matlin is a Canadian entrepreneur best known for being the President and founder of North American home alarm company AlarmForce, a home alarm company that Matlin led for 25 years.

History 
Joel Matlin was born and raised in Montreal. He attended Concordia University studying business. He has returned to Concordia as a guest lecturer at the John Molson School of Business. Matlin has also appeared as a guest speaker at the Ted Rogers School of Management and Trent University.

In 1969 Matlin founded Frisco Bay Industries and was President until 1988. Frisco Bay was a leading supplier of integrated security systems and bank automation to major corporations including the Canadian Banks, Bell Canada, and the Canadian Mint and other prominent companies. During Matlin's leadership he co-founded a home alarm company, Alarmtron with two partners in 1979 until its sale in 1981. Matlin vowed that he would return to the home alarm market once the technology was perfected. In 1988 Matlin planned to re-enter the home alarm business under the Frisco Bay banner, which resulted in a dispute with his business partner. In November 1988 Matlin triggered the shot gun clause of his partnership agreement which resulted in Matlin selling his shares and exiting Frisco Bay Industries. Subsequent to Matlin's departure Frisco Bay was purchased by Stanley Black & Decker for $45m.

In 1988 after Matlin had sold his interest in Frisco Bay Industries he founded AlarmForce Industries. As President and CEO he guided AlarmForce for 25 years to becoming the 3rd largest home alarm company in Canada and one of the top 20 in the USA. Matlin was instrumental in bringing AlarmForce public, initially on the Canadian Dealer Network and then having it listed in 1997 on the Toronto Stock Exchange. Matlin directed the company from inception achieving a market cap of $135 million on his departure.

In July 2013 Matlin was fired by the AlarmForce board of directors. Matlin sued the company for $11.3 million, which was settled in February 2016.

Following Matlin's departure from AlarmForce after 25 years during his one-year non-compete, Matlin and his son Adam started Matlin Creative, a marketing and consultancy business.

In June 2015 Matlin co-founded Think Protection with his son Adam. Think Protection is a DIY mass-market home alarm company targeting consumers in both Canada and the US. Under the Matlins leadership, Think Protection successfully penetrated the DIY alarm market and established thousands of monitored accounts throughout Canada and the United States.

As of November 2019, Joel divested his investment in Think Protection and is no longer affiliated with the company.

On September 13 2020, Joel started hosting a national weekly radio show - "The Joel Matlin Entrepreneur Show"  The show is broadcast on the Global/Corus radio network every Sunday at 5pm EST. In Toronto on AM640 and other local stations in Hamilton, London, Winnipeg, Calgary, Edmonton and Vancouver.

References 

Year of birth missing (living people)
Living people
Canadian chief executives
Chief executives in the manufacturing industry